English Phonetics and Phonology is a book by Peter Roach in which the author provides an introduction to the phonological structure of the English language.

Reception
The book was reviewed by Sean Bowerman and Tunku Mohani Mohtar.

References

External links
English Phonetics and Phonology

Phonology books
Linguistics textbooks
1983 non-fiction books
Cambridge University Press books